May Slessinger (May 4, 1872 – October 25, 1954) was an American artist specializing in miniatures, based in San Francisco, California.

Early life 
May Slessinger was born on May 4, 1872 in San Francisco, California, the daughter of Lewis (or Louis) Slessinger and Caroline Price Slessinger. Her Bavarian-born father, a shoemaker by training, was an American Civil War veteran, and one of the city's first businessmen. The Slessinger family was Jewish.

Career 
Slessinger was a painter who specialized in painting miniature portraits. She was a member of the San Francisco Art Association. Of her work at one of the Association's shows in 1903, one report commented that "Miss May Slessinger's work is of a high order of merit, for it shows the fire of the true artist and the technique of a careful worker. One of her miniatures is the size of a dime and every detail of the subject is carefully wrought."

Slessinger made miniature portraits of several prominent San Francisco citizens, including artist William Keith, businesswoman Mary Ann Magnin and her son Grover Magnin, and Elizabeth Meyerfeld Roos, the daughter of theatrical entrepreneur Morris Meyerfeld Jr. In 1920, Queen Marie of Romania named Slessinger her court miniaturist, in appreciation of Slessinger's portrait of the queen; dancer Loie Fuller, working with the Red Cross in Rumania during World War I, suggested Slessinger for the portrait commission.

Personal life 
Slessinger married oil executive David S. Bachman in 1922, on his deathbed and inherited half his fortune. She lived for many years at the Fairmont Hotel and died on October 25, 1954 in San Francisco. She was 82. Slessinger left a large estate to benefit her relatives and research at the Mount Zion Hospital.

References 

1872 births
1954 deaths
American women painters
Portrait miniaturists
19th-century American painters
19th-century American women artists
20th-century American painters
20th-century American women artists
Artists from San Francisco
Painters from California
American portrait painters
American people of German-Jewish descent